Baby blue is a color.

Baby blue may also refer to:

Music

Songs
 "Baby Blue" (The Echoes song), a 1961 song by The Echoes
 "It's All Over Now, Baby Blue", a 1965 song by Bob Dylan
 "Baby Blue" (Badfinger song), a 1971 song by Badfinger
 "Baby Blue" (King Krule song), 2013
 "Baby Blue", a 1979 song by The Beach Boys from their album L.A. (Light Album)
 "Baby Blue", a 1985 song by Đorđe Balašević from his album 003
 "Baby Blue" (George Strait song), a 1988 song by George Strait
 "Baby Blue" (Emilíana Torrini song), a 1999 song by Emilíana Torrini
 "Baby Blue" (Action Bronson song), a 2015 song by Action Bronson featuring Chance the Rapper
 "Baby Blue", a 1976 song by Chilliwack
 "Baby Blue", a 1979 song by Dusty Springfield
 "Baby Blue", a 1996 song by Fishmans
 "Baby Blue", a 1958 song by Gene Vincent
 "Baby Blue", a 1974 hit song by George Baker Selection
 "Baby Blue", a 2008 song by Martina Topley-Bird
 "Baby Blue", a 2011 song by Scanners
 "Baby Blue", a 2002 song by The Warlocks

Other uses in music
Baby Blue (rapper), female rapper from London
 Ala Diamond "Baby Blue" Smith, a member of Pretty Ricky
 Baby Blue, an alias for Tin Tin Out
 Baby Blue (album), a 2000 album by Anahí
 Baby Blue (group), a Filipino idol group

Other uses
 Baby Blue's Manual of Legal Citation, an open-source legal style guide based on Bluebook
 The Baby Blue Movie, a Canadian programming block that aired on Citytv 
 "Baby Blue" (Person of Interest), an episode of the American television drama series Person of Interest
 Baby Blue, a short animation by Shinichiro Watanabe, part of the anthology Genius Party

See also 
 Baby Blues (disambiguation)
 Blue baby